Turani (also Romanized as Tūrānī) is a village in Fazl Rural District, in the Central District of Nishapur County, Razavi Khorasan Province, Iran. At the 2006 census, its population was 141, in 43 families.

See also

References 

Populated places in Nishapur County